Edward Pols (1919–2005) was an American philosopher and Professor of Philosophy at Bowdoin College. He was a president of the Metaphysical Society of America.

He won the J.N. Findlay Award of the Metaphysical Society of America in 1994 for Radical Realism (1992).

Works
 Acts of our being a reflection on agency and responsibility
 Meditation on a prisoner: towards understanding action and mind
 Mind regained
 Radical realism: direct knowing in science and philosophy
 The recognition of reason
 Whitehead's metaphysics: a critical examination of Process and Reality

References

20th-century American philosophers
Philosophy academics
1919 births
2005 deaths
Presidents of the Metaphysical Society of America
Harvard University alumni
Bowdoin College faculty